Sheikha Jawaher bint Hamad bin Suhaim Al Thani (born 1984) is a Qatari royal and the first wife and consort of Tamim bin Hamad Al Thani, the Emir of Qatar. A member of the Qatari royal family by birth, she is the daughter of former government minister Sheikh Hamad bin Suhaim Al Thani and a grandniece of Emir Khalifa bin Hamad Al Thani. She is a second cousin of her husband. As the first wife of the Emir, she accompanied him on an official state visit to Spain in 2022, where she was presented with the Royal Order of Isabella the Catholic by King Felipe.

Personal life 
Sheikha Jawaher was born in Doha in 1984 to Sheikh Hamad bin Suhaim Al Thani, a government minister and member of the Qatari royal family by his first wife, Sheikha Hessa bint Ahmad bin Saif Al Thani. Her paternal grandfather, Sheikh Suhaim bin Hamad Al Thani, was the Qatari foreign minister. She is a grandniece of Khalifa bin Hamad Al Thani, who ruled as the Emir of Qatar. 

She married her second cousin, Tamim bin Hamad Al Thani, on 8 January 2005 at Al Wajbah Palace. They have four children, two sons and two daughters:
Sheikha Al Mayassa bint Tamim bin Hamad Al Thani (born 15 January 2006).
Sheikh Hamad bin Tamim bin Hamad Al Thani (born 20 October 2008).
Sheikha Aisha bint Tamim bin Hamad Al Thani (born 24 August 2010).
Sheikh Jassim bin Tamim bin Hamad Al Thani (born 12 June 2012).

She is the Emir's first of three wives; the other two are Sheikha Al-Anoud bint Mana Al Hajri and Sheikha Noora bint Hathal Al Dosari. 

In 2018, she called on Qataris to boycott Hajj.

In 2021, she received a Master of Arts degree from Qatar University.

Her name, Jawaher (or Jawahir) means "Jewels".

Royal duties 
Sheikha Jawaher's husband succeeded his father, Hamad bin Khalifa Al Thani, as Emir of Qatar on 25 June 2013. As his first wife, she serves as his consort.

In 2017, she served as royal patron of the graduating class of female students at her alma mater, Qatar University. In May 2022, she served again as royal patron at the 45th graduating class of female students at her the university. She honoured 479 of the 2,767 female students with awards for outstanding scholarship. 

In October 2021, Sheikha Jawaher met with Queen Rania of Jordan at The Pearl-Qatar and hosted a banquet in her honor.

Sheikha Jawaher accompanied her husband on an official state visit to Spain in May 2022. The trip was her first official state visit as consort since her husband became Emir in 2013. She and her husband attended a banquet luncheon hosted in their honour at the Palace of Zarzuela by King Felipe VI and Queen Letizia of Spain. Later, they were guests of honor at a state dinner at the Royal Palace of Madrid She was presented with the Royal Order of Isabella the Catholic by King Felipe VI.

On 19 September 2022, Sheikha Jawaher accompanied her husband at the state funeral of Elizabeth II.

Foreign honours
 Dame Grand Cross of the Royal Order of Isabella the Catholic (Spain; 17 May 2022).

References 

Living people
1984 births
House of Thani
People from Doha
Qatari Muslims
Qatari royalty
Qatar University alumni
Royal consorts
Dames Grand Cross of the Order of Isabella the Catholic